Tehov may refer to places in the Czech Republic:
Tehov (Benešov District), a municipality and village in the Central Bohemian Region
Tehov (Prague-East District), a municipality and village in the Central Bohemian Region